The  is an annual marathon road race for women over the classic distance of 42.195 kilometres which is held on the 4th or 5th Sunday of January in the city of Osaka, Japan, and hosted by Japan Association of Athletics Federations, Kansai Telecasting Corporation, the Sankei Shimbun, Sankei Sports, Radio Osaka and Osaka City.

The first edition took place on January 24, 1982, and was won by Italy's Rita Marchisio. The 1995 marathon was cancelled due to the Great Hanshin earthquake. The race takes place in the city and passes prominent landmarks such as Osaka Castle. The course was altered in 2011 to allow for faster times by cutting out a number of hilly sections near Osaka Castle. The finish line of the race is at Nagai Stadium, which was the host venue for the 2007 World Championships in Athletics.

The Osaka Half Marathon, open regardless of gender, is held alongside the women's marathon.

The Japanese rock group The Alfee has written many of the theme songs for the marathon.

Winners 

Key: 

* Tetyana Hamera-Shmyrko was suspended by the Ukrainian Athletic Federation for four years from 30 September 2015 until 29 September 2019 due to doping rules violation. All her results from 26 August 2011 to 30 September 2015, including victories in the 2013, 2014 and 2015 editions of the Osaka International Ladies Marathon, were annulled.

Notes 

1  2021 edition has male pacemakers including Yuki Kawauchi

References

List of winners
 Ota, Shigenobu & Larner, Brett (2009-12-27). Osaka International Women's Marathon. ARRS. Retrieved on 2010-01-31.

External links

  
 Marathon info
Statistical overview by Ken Nakamura (2011)

Sport in Osaka
Recurring sporting events established in 1982
Women's marathons in Japan
1982 establishments in Japan